Mareno di Piave is a comune (municipality) in the Province of Treviso in the Italian region Veneto, located about  north of Venice and about  northeast of Treviso.

Mareno di Piave borders the following municipalities: Cimadolmo, Codogné, Conegliano, San Vendemiano, Santa Lucia di Piave, Spresiano, Vazzola.

Demographic evolution 

The following graph shows the changes in the municipality's population over time.

References

Cities and towns in Veneto